Lajpat Nagar railway station is a small railway station in Lajpat Nagar which is a residential and commercial neighborhood of the South Delhi district of Delhi. Its code is LPNR. The station is part of Delhi Suburban Railway. The station consist of four platforms.

See also

 Hazrat Nizamuddin railway station
 New Delhi Railway Station
 Delhi Junction Railway station
 Anand Vihar Railway Terminal
 Sarai Rohilla Railway Station
 Delhi Metro

References 

Railway stations in South East Delhi district
Delhi railway division
Memorials to Lala Lajpat Rai